is a 1988 music-centric film that tells the story of a girl from the United States, a boy from Japan, and a briefly successful pop band. The film contrasts American customs with Tokyo lifestyles, as it presents an evolving love story between the two main characters.

Directed by Fran Rubel Kuzui, the film stars Carrie Hamilton as Wendy Reed and Yutaka Tadokoro (also known as Diamond Yukai) as Hiro Yamaguchi. In real life, Tadokoro was the frontman of the 1980s rock group Red Warriors, who also star in the film as themselves. Other notable actors include Gina Belafonte and Tetsuro Tamba. Popular Japanese metal band X Japan also make a brief cameo appearance, though they were not credited.

Plot
The plot centers around a young American singer named Wendy Reed, who wants to leave the US and her boyfriend (a musician played by Michael Cerveris), and travel to Tokyo, Japan, after hearing of the success of foreign groups overseas. She plans to visit a girlfriend but cannot find her. Instead she meets a young man named Hiro, who is the leader of an unsuccessful rock band. Wendy's appeal as a tall blonde American woman draws attention to both the locals and the band themselves. She falls in love with Hiro and develops a music career as the movie advances. With some tricks they manage to catch the eye of a record label producer and achieve success for a short time. The song, which is played throughout, is a cover version from John Sebastian's Do you believe in magic? While they top the charts, there is some luxury in their lives, but the blossoming relationship of the main couple starts breaking apart. A business mogul tells Wendy that being a foreign singer in Japan is looked at as a novelty, and questions the longevity of her career, citing quickly changing trends in pop culture as the reason. Wendy, no longer wanting to be used a gimmick, encourages Hiro to perform his own original songs as frontman for the band, so that their true essence will be the highlight and no longer based on Wendy's looks. Hiro does this towards the end and succeeds at the concert. Wendy realizes that "Tokyo Pop" is a one-day business where groups have their fifteen minutes of fame and then vanish forever. Since this is the case, Wendy goes back to the US in hopes of finding a more stable career. She appreciates the time she spent with Hiro, and the two have inspired one another. However, she believes she can leave him behind because she has given him the hope to believe in himself as a writer. At the end of the film, during the credits, Wendy is seen in the studio performing an original song inspired by her time with Hiro.

Cast
 Carrie Hamilton
 Diamond Yukai
 Tetsurō Tamba
 Masumi Harukawa
 Taiji Tonoyama

Release
The film was released in the US on VHS and Laserdisc formats. No DVD release is currently available.

Soundtrack
The soundtrack was released in 1988 on CD, cassette and vinyl LP by RIC Records. It features all the original songs written for the movie and performed by Hamilton and Tadokoro, as well as other artists featured in the film.

References

External links 

1988 films
American independent films
English-language Japanese films
1980s musical comedy films
1988 multilingual films
Japanese independent films
American musical comedy films
Japanese multilingual films
American multilingual films
1988 directorial debut films
1988 comedy films
Japan in non-Japanese culture
1980s American films